Micrechites is a genus of flowering plants in the family Apocynaceae, first described as a genus in 1857. It is native to China, the eastern Himalayas, Southeast Asia, Papuasia, and Queensland.

Species
Note - synonyms in parentheses are names used in Flora of China
 Micrechites andamanicus M.Gangop. & Chakrab. - Andaman Islands
 Micrechites archboldianus Merr. & L.M.Perry - W New Guinea
 Micrechites glaber D.J.Middleton - Sabah
 Micrechites grandiflorus (D.J.Middleton) D.J.Middleton - Papua New Guinea
 Micrechites jacquetii Pierre ex Spire (syn Ichnocarpus jacquetii (Pierre) D. J. Middleton) - Guangdong, Guangxi, Laos, Vietnam
 Micrechites malipoensis Tsiang & P.T.Li (syn Ichnocarpus malipoensis (Tsiang & P. T. Li) D. J. Middleton) - Yunnan
 Micrechites novoguineensis K.Schum. - Papua New Guinea
 Micrechites parkinsonii M.Gangop. & Chakrab. - Andaman Islands
 Micrechites polyanthus (Blume) Miq. (syn Ichnocarpus polyanthus (Blume) P. I. Forster) - China (Guangdong, Guangxi, Hainan, Yunnan, Nepal, Assam, Bhutan, Andaman Islands, Indochina, Malaysia, Borneo, Java, Sumatra
 Micrechites rhombifolius Markgr. - Maluku, Sulawesi, Papuasia, Queensland
 Micrechites serpyllifolius (Blume) Kosterm. - Thailand, Malaysia, Borneo, Sumatra, Java, Sulawesi, Philippines 
 Micrechites warianus (Schltr.) D.J.Middleton - Papua New Guinea

formerly included
 Micrechites borneensis (King & Gamble) P.T.Li = Anodendron borneense (King & Gamble) D.J.Middleton
 Micrechites formicinus Tsiang & P.T.Li = Anodendron nervosum Kerr.
 Micrechites gracilis (King & Gamble) P.T.Li = Anodendron gracile (King & Gamble) D.J.Middleton
 Micrechites minutiflorus (Pierre) P.T.Li = Urceola minutiflora (Pierre) D.J.Middleton
 Micrechites napeensis Quint = Urceola napeensis (Quint.) D.J.Middleton
 Micrechites ovalifolius Ridl. = Parameria polyneura Hook.f.
 Micrechites sinensis Markgr. = Ichnocarpus frutescens (L.) W.T.Aiton
 Micrechites tubulosus Ridl. ex Burkill & M.R.Hend. = Anodendron tubulosum (Ridl. ex Burkill & M.R.Hend.) D.J.Middleton

References

Apocynaceae genera
Apocyneae